Harry Vivian Shearn (28 April 1892 – 21 January 1951) was an Australian politician who was an independent member of the Legislative Assembly of Western Australia from 1936 until his death, representing the seat of Maylands.

Shearn was born in Guildford, Western Australia, to Matilda Anne (née Connolly) and Michael Shearn. He worked for his father's real estate agency after leaving school, and took it over completely following his father's death in 1917. Shearn was elected to the Perth Road Board in 1930, and served as chairman from 1935 to 1936. He entered parliament at the 1936 state election, winning Maylands from the Labor Party's Robert Clothier.

After the 1947 state election produced a hung parliament, Shearn and another independent, William Read, gave their support to the Liberal Party, allowing Ross McLarty to form a government. The situation persisted after the 1950 election, albeit with the support of another independent, David Grayden. Shearn died suddenly in January 1951, aged 58. He had married Emily Ann Watts  in 1918, with whom he had two children, Hartley Vivian (Viv) and Marian (Lorraine).

See also
 Independent politicians in Australia

References

1892 births
1951 deaths
Independent members of the Parliament of Western Australia
Mayors of places in Western Australia
Members of the Western Australian Legislative Assembly
Politicians from Perth, Western Australia
Western Australian local councillors